Hamaxitus was a town of ancient Caria mentioned by Pliny the Elder as being on north coast of the Cnidian Chersonesus. Its site is unlocated.

References

Populated places in ancient Caria
Former populated places in Turkey
Lost ancient cities and towns